Anatoliy Anatoliyovych Masalov (born 17 February 1990) is a Ukrainian professional footballer who plays as an attacking midfielder.

Career
Masalov is a product of the UOR Simferopol youth sportive school. He played for different Ukrainian First League clubs. In June 2015 he signed a contract with FC Poltava.

References

External links
 
 
 

1990 births
Living people
Ukrainian footballers
Association football midfielders
FC Tytan Armyansk players
FC Krystal Kherson players
PFC Sumy players
FC Stal Alchevsk
FC Stal Kamianske players
FC Poltava players
FC Helios Kharkiv players
FC Kremin Kremenchuk players
SC Tavriya Simferopol players
MFC Mykolaiv players
Ukrainian First League players
Ukrainian Second League players
Ukrainian Amateur Football Championship players
Sportspeople from Kherson Oblast